In geometry, the Chebyshev center of a bounded set  having non-empty interior is the center of the minimal-radius ball enclosing the entire set , or alternatively (and non-equivalently) the center of largest inscribed ball of .

In the field of parameter estimation, the Chebyshev center approach tries to find an estimator  for  given the feasibility set , such that  minimizes the worst possible estimation error for x (e.g. best worst case).

Mathematical representation 
There exist several alternative representations for the Chebyshev center.

 

with respect to the Euclidean norm , or alternatively by solving:

Despite these properties, finding the Chebyshev center may be a hard numerical optimization problem. For example, in the second representation above, the inner maximization is non-convex if the set Q is not convex.

Properties 
In other words, the search for the Chebyshev center can be conducted inside  without loss of generality.

For instance, if  is the tetrahedron formed by the convex hull of the points (1,1,1), (-1,1,1), (1,-1,1) and (1,1,-1), then computing the Chebyshev center using the  norm yields

Relaxed Chebyshev center 
Consider the case in which the set  can be represented as the intersection of  ellipsoids.

 
with
 

By introducing an additional matrix variable , we can write the inner maximization problem of the Chebyshev center as:

 
where  is the trace operator and
 
 

 
with 
 

This last convex optimization problem is known as the relaxed Chebyshev center (RCC).
The RCC has the following important properties:
 The RCC is an upper bound for the exact Chebyshev center.
 The RCC is unique.
 The RCC is feasible.

Constrained least squares 
It can be shown that the well-known constrained least squares (CLS) problem is a relaxed version of the Chebyshev center.

The original CLS problem can be formulated as:
 
with 
 
 

It can be shown that this problem is equivalent to the following optimization problem:
 
with
 

One can see that this problem is a relaxation of the Chebyshev center (though different than the RCC described above).

RCC vs. CLS 
A solution set  for the RCC is also a solution for the CLS, and thus .
This means that the CLS estimate is the solution of a looser relaxation than that of the RCC.
Hence the CLS is an upper bound for the RCC, which is an upper bound for the real Chebyshev center.

Modeling constraints 
This of course affects the quality of the RCC and CLS estimators.
As a simple example consider the linear box constraints: 
 
which can alternatively be written as
 
It turns out that the first representation results with an upper bound estimator for the second one, hence using it may dramatically decrease the quality of the calculated estimator.

This simple example shows us that great care should be given to the formulation of constraints when relaxation of the feasibility region is used.

Linear programming problem  
This problem can be formulated as a linear programming problem, provided that the region Q is an intersection of finitely many hyperplanes. Given a polytope, Q, defined as follows then it can be solved via the following linear program.

See also 
 Bounding sphere
 Smallest-circle problem
 Circumscribed circle (covers circumcenter)
 Centre (geometry)
 Centroid

References 

 Y. C. Eldar, A. Beck, and M. Teboulle, "A Minimax Chebyshev Estimator for Bounded Error Estimation," IEEE Trans. Signal Process., 56(4): 1388–1397 (2007).
 A. Beck and Y. C. Eldar, "Regularization in Regression with Bounded Noise: A Chebyshev Center Approach," SIAM J. Matrix Anal. Appl. 29 (2): 606–625 (2007).

Estimation methods
Geometric centers
Mathematical optimization